Rob Geurts (born 23 June 1959) is a Dutch bobsledder. He competed in the two man event at the 1994 Winter Olympics.

As of 2010, he was a gym owner in Nieuwegein. He attended the 2010 Winter Olympics as a coach with both the Japanese and Dutch national bobsled teams.

References

External links
 

1959 births
Living people
Dutch male bobsledders
Olympic bobsledders of the Netherlands
Bobsledders at the 1994 Winter Olympics
Sportspeople from Utrecht (city)